In My Prime Vol. 1 is an album by drummer Art Blakey and the Jazz Messengers recorded in 1977 and released on the Dutch Timeless label.

Reception

Allmusic awarded the album 3 stars stating that "Despite the changes in musical fashions, Art Blakey and his hard-bop institution were still turning out new material and solos in the late '70s that sound fresh and alive today".

Track listing 
 "Jody" (Walter Davis, Jr.) - 10:21   
"Not So Far At All" (Valery Ponomarev) - 3:27
 "1978" (James Williams) - 7:27   
 "To See Her Face" (Robert Watson) - 6:24   
 "Kamal" (Dennis Irwin) - 14:40

Personnel 
Art Blakey - drums
Valery Ponomarev - trumpet
Curtis Fuller - trombone
Robert Watson - alto saxophone
David Schnitter - tenor saxophone
James Williams - piano
Dennis Irwin - bass
Ray Mantilla - percussion

References 

Art Blakey albums
The Jazz Messengers albums
1978 albums
Timeless Records albums